The 2nd constituency of Nógrád County is one of the single member constituencies of the National Assembly, the national legislature of Hungary. The constituency standard abbreviation: Nógrád 02. OEVK.

Since 2014, it has been represented by Mihály Balla of the Fidesz–KDNP party alliance.

Geography
The 2nd constituency is located in western part of Nógrád County.

List of municipalities
The constituency includes the following municipalities:

History
The 2nd constituency of Nógrád County was created in 2011 and contained of the pre-2011 abolished constituencies of 4th and part of 3rd and 2nd constituency of this County. Its borders have not changed since its creation.

Members
The constituency was first represented by Mihály Balla of the Fidesz from 2014, and he was re-elected in 2018 and 2022.

References

Nógrád 2nd